Not Safe with Nikki Glaser is an American television sex comedy talk show series hosted by Nikki Glaser. It premiered February 9, 2016 at 10:30 p.m. in the United States on Comedy Central, in Canada on MUCH, and in the United Kingdom on 4Music. The show features Glaser and a panel of comedians as they talk about topics about sex.

On March 29, 2016, Comedy Central extended the episode order of the first season by 10 episodes. The second half of the season premiered on June 7, 2016. On November 11, 2016, the show was cancelled.

Recurring guests

 Rachel Feinstein (1 and 19)
 Ron Funches (2 and 16)
 Chris D'Elia (3 and 12)
 Jim Jefferies (4 and 15)
 Bridget Everett (4 and 20)
 Moshe Kasher (7 and 18)
 Kristen Schaal (8 and 12)

Recurring segments

Tinder Tapout (episode 1, 5, 10, 11, 16, 20)
 Nikki goes on Tinder under her "Party Bitch Kayla" persona and says progressively strange things to try and alienate the man she's in contact with. Her guests guess after each statement whether or not he tapped out (ended the conversation) or responded.

Comedians Do Porn (episode 3, 8, 12, 18)
 Nikki and a guest each tells porn actors what to say during an improv skit with simulated sex.

Pay Your Tab Cab (episode 2, 12, 19)
 Nikki and a stripper co-host drive around in a cab and pick up men who have just left a strip club. She asks them some questions about women to give them a chance to win some money back.

Sext Symbols (episode 4 and 12)
 Nikki asks a guest to type out a story purely in emojis. She then guesses what they intended by the symbols. Then the guest explains what they intended the emojis to mean.

What's Your Number? (episode 8 and 13)
 A video is shown of an interviewed person stating a number in response to a question. Nikki provides 3 possible questions the number is an answer to. Her guests must guess which question was the one which was asked.

The Sex Talk (episode 10 and 17)
 Nikki and her guests give "the talk" but use different animals as stand-ins for children to avoid the advice causing mental harm. This segment was also on Nikki's previous show, Nikki and Sara Live.

(Lie Detector, this segment does not have a title) (episode 1 and 4)
 On the pilot, Nikki hooks her friends up to a lie detector and asks them, "Do you want to have sex with me?" The tests are done by John, an expert polygraph examiner. In the episode "Already Wet", she does the tests with her parents and asks them about their sex life.

Episodes

Not Safe Podcast

Not Safe Podcast is an internet podcast series co-hosted by Nikki Glaser and Dan St. Germain. St. Germain is one of the writers of Not Safe with Nikki Glaser. The series is hosted on SoundCloud. It has been airing since its first episode on Jan 7, 2016, which is roughly one month earlier than the broadcast of the television show. On the series Glaser and St. Germain talk about sex news and personal relationship stories.

References

External links
 
 Not Safe with Nikki Glaser at Comedy Central
 
 
 
 Not Safe Podcast

2016 American television series debuts
2016 American television series endings
2010s American late-night television series
2010s American sex comedy television series
2010s American television talk shows
Comedy Central late-night programming
Comedy Central original programming
English-language television shows